Oscar Friedrich von Fraas (17 January 1824, in Lorch (Württemberg) – 22 November 1897, in Stuttgart) was a German clergyman, paleontologist and geologist. He was the father of geologist Eberhard Fraas (1862–1915).

Biography 
He studied theology at the University of Tübingen (ministry exam, 1845). He was also deeply interested in natural sciences, and while a student at Tübingen was influenced by geologist Friedrich August von Quenstedt. In 1847 he travelled to Paris, where he attended lectures given by Alcide d'Orbigny and Jean-Baptiste Élie de Beaumont. From 1850 to 1854, he served as a pastor in Laufen an der Eyach, and in the meantime obtained in his doctorate from the University of Würzburg (1851). In 1854 he was named curator of the department of mineralogy and paleontology at the Royal Württemberg museum of natural history in Stuttgart, where he greatly added to its collections of Swabian fossil batrachians, reptiles and mammals.

With Karl Deffner (1817–1877), he conducted a geological survey of Württemberg, and in the field of applied geology, he made contributions towards the Swabian Albwasserversorgung (Schwäbian Alb water supply project). In addition to his geological and paleontological studies of Württemberg, he conducted scientific investigations of the Middle East, based on travels to the region in 1864–65 and 1875. As a result of his Middle Eastern travels in Egypt, Syria and Lebanon, he published the two part Aus dem Orient (1867, 1878).

Fraas was a critic of Darwinism and evolution. He believed in a biblical flood and held creationist views. He authored the book Vor der Sündfluth (Before the Flood) in 1866.

Selected works 

 Die nutzbaren Minerale Württembergs. Stuttgart: Ebner & Seubert, 1860.
Vor der Sündfluth (1866)
 Aus dem Orient, 2 Theile, Stuttgart 1867–1878.
  [Theil 1], Geologische Beobachtungen am Nil, auf der Sinai-Halbinsel und in Syrien. Stuttgart: Ebner & Seubert, 1867.
  [Theil 2], Geologische Beobachtungen am Lebanon. Stuttgart: Schweizerbart, 1878.
 Die geognostische Sammlung Württembergs im Erdgeschoss des Königlichen Naturalien-Cabinets zu Stuttgart. Ein Führer für die Besucher desselben, 1869
 Geognostiche beschreibung von Württemberg : Baden und Hohenzollern, 1882.

References 

1824 births
1897 deaths
People from Lorch (Württemberg)
People from the Kingdom of Württemberg
Christian creationists
19th-century German geologists
German paleontologists
University of Tübingen alumni